Pretty-printing (or prettyprinting) is the application of any of various stylistic formatting conventions to text files, such as source code, markup, and similar kinds of content. These formatting conventions may entail adhering to an indentation style, using different color and typeface to highlight syntactic elements of source code, or adjusting size, to make the content easier for people to read, and understand. Pretty-printers for source code are sometimes called code formatters or beautifiers.

Pretty-printing mathematics

Pretty-printing usually refers to displaying mathematical expressions similar to the way they would be typeset professionally. For example, in computer algebra systems such as Maxima or Mathematica the system may write output like "x ^ 2 + 3 * x" as   Some graphing calculators, such as the Casio 9860 series, HP-49 series, TI-84 Plus, TI-89, and TI-Nspire, the TI-83 Plus with the PrettyPt add-on, or the TI-84 Plus with the same add-on or the "MathPrint"-enabled OSes, can perform pretty-printing. Additionally, a number of newer scientific calculators are equipped with dot matrix screens capable of pretty-printing such as the Casio FX-ES series (Natural Display), Sharp EL-W series (WriteView), HP SmartCalc 300s, TI-30XB, and Numworks.

Many text formatting programs can also typeset mathematics: TeX was developed specifically for high-quality mathematical typesetting.

Pretty-printing markup and tag-based code

Pretty-printing in markup language instances is most typically associated with indentation of tags and string content to visually determine hierarchy and nesting. Although the syntactical structures of tag-based languages do not significantly vary, the indentation may vary significantly due to how a markup language is interpreted or due to the data it describes.

In MathML, whitespace characters do not reflect data, meaning, or syntax above what is required by XML syntax. In HTML, whitespace characters between tags are considered text and are parsed as text nodes into the parsed result. While indentation may be generously applied to a MathML document, sufficient additional care must be taken in pretty-printing an HTML document to ensure additional text nodes are not created or destroyed in general proximity to the content or content-reflective tag elements. This difference in complexity is non-trivial from the perspective of an automated pretty-print operation where no special rules or edge cases are necessary, as in the more simple MathML example. The HTML example may require a series of progressive interrelated algorithms to account for various patterns of tag elements and content that conforms to a uniform style and is consistent in application across various instances, as evidenced by the markup.ts application component used to beautify HTML, XML, and related technologies for the Pretty Diff tool.

Programming code formatting
Programmers often use tools to format programming language source code in a particular manner. Proper code formatting makes it easier to read and understand. Different programmers often prefer different styles of formatting, such as the use of code indentation and whitespace or positioning of braces. A code formatter converts source code from one format style to another. This is relatively straightforward because of the unambiguous syntax of programming languages. Code beautification involves parsing the source code into component structures, such as assignment statements, if blocks, loops, etc. (see also control flow), and formatting them in a manner specified by the user in a configuration file.

Code beautifiers exist as standalone applications and built into text editors and integrated development environments. For example, Emacs' various language modes can correctly indent blocks of code attractively.

HTML

Lisp pretty-printer
An early example of pretty-printing was Bill Gosper's "GRINDEF" (i.e. 'grind function') program (c. 1967), which used combinatorial search with pruning to format LISP programs. Early versions operated on the executable (list structure) form of the Lisp program and were oblivious to the special meanings of various functions. Later versions had special read conventions for incorporating non-executable comments and also for preserving read macros in unexpanded form. They also allowed special indentation conventions for special functions such as if. The term "grind" was used in some Lisp circles as a synonym for pretty-printing.

Project style rules
Many open source projects have established rules for code layout. The most typical are the GNU formatting and the BSD style. The biggest difference between the two is the location of the braces: in the GNU style, opening and closing braces are on lines by themselves, with the same indent. BSD style places an opening brace at the end of the preceding line, and the closing braces can be followed by else. The size of indent and location of whitespace also differs.

Example of formatting and beautifying code
The following example shows some typical C structures and how various indentation style rules format them. Without any formatting at all, it looks like this:
int foo(int k){if(k<1||k>2){printf("out of range\n");
printf("this function requires a value of 1 or 2\n");}else{
printf("Switching\n");switch(k){case 1:printf("1\n");break;case
2:printf("2\n");break;}}}
The GNU indent program produces the following output when asked to indent according to the GNU rules:
int
foo (int k)
{
  if (k < 1 || k > 2)
    {
      printf ("out of range\n");
      printf ("this function requires a value of 1 or 2\n");
    }
  else
    {
      printf ("Switching\n");
      switch (k)
        {
        case 1:
          printf ("1\n");
          break;
        case 2:
          printf ("2\n");
          break;
        }
    }
}
It produces this output when formatting according to BSD rules:
int
foo(int k) {
	if (k < 1 || k > 2) {
		printf("out of range\n");
		printf("this function requires a value of 1 or 2\n");
	} else {
		printf("Switching\n");
		switch (k) {
		case 1:
			printf("1\n");
			break;
		case 2:
			printf("2\n");
			break;
		}
	}
}

See also
Related concepts
Elastic tabstop, a feature of many source code editors that detects and maintains aligned indents
 Minification, making source code compact, even if it becomes harder for humans to understand
 Obfuscation, deliberately making source code very difficult for humans to understand, even if it becomes somewhat convoluted
Utilities

enscript, a text-to-PostScript converter, with pretty-printing features

References

External links
 Algorithm 268: ALGOL 60 reference language editor William M. McKeeman: Commun. ACM 8(11): 667-668 (1965)
 lgrind, Comprehensive TEX Archive Network
 NEATER2: a PL/I source statement reformatter Kenneth Conrow, Ronald G. Smith: Commun. ACM 13(11): 669-675 (1970)
 SOAP - Simplify Obscure Algol Programs R. S. Scowen, D. Allin, A. L. Hillman, M. Shimell: National Physical Laboratory Central Computer Unit report CCU6 (April, 1969) Includes formatted listing of SOAP source code.
 SOAP - A Program which Documents and Edits ALGOL 60 Programs. R. S. Scowen, D. Allin, A. L. Hillman, M. Shimell: Comput. J. 14(2): 133-135 (1971)
 Original SOAP Source Code from the KDF9 (unformatted)
 SOAP User's Guide. (for Edinburgh IMP) Peter Salkeld Robertson (1976)
 SOAP Source Code in/for IMP9
 Soap80: A Program for Formatting IMP80 Source Programs. J.M. Murison, Edinburgh Regional Computer Center (1980)
 SOAP Source Code in/for IMP80 E. N. Gregory, University of Kent at Canterbury; Peter D. Stephens, Edinburgh Regional Computer Center
 PRETTYP.PAS Early pascal prettyprinter. Ledgard et al.
 Pascal With Style (1979)
 style(9) FreeBSD style guidelines
 vgrind, The [Unix] Heirloom Project
 Formatting your source code GNU style guidelines

Articles with example C code
Source code
Text editor features